Sibyl Wilbur O'Brien Stone (May 27, 1871 – July 21, 1946), best known as Sibyl Wilbur, was an American journalist, suffragist, and author of a biography of Mary Baker Eddy. She was a San Diego Branch Member of the National League of American Pen Women and a member of the New England Woman's Press Association.<ref>Lyons, Louis S. (1922). 'Who's Who Among the Women of California. Security Publishing Company. p. 155</ref>

Biography
Originally from Elmira, New York, Wilbur's parents both died when she young, and by 14 she had moved to Nebraska and begun teaching at a prairie school. Eventually she saved enough money to go to college and start a career in journalism. For over 20 years she wrote for major metropolitan newspapers in New York, Chicago, Washington, D.C., Minneapolis, and Boston, on topics such as women's rights, labor issues, and culture. She was politically active as an organizer in the Woman Suffrage Party in New York City, and spoke publicly on the topic.

She is most known for her writings on Mary Baker Eddy, founder of The First Church of Christ, Scientist, who she met in 1905 while interviewing her for the Boston Herald. From 1906 to 1907, Wilbur wrote a series of thirteen articles about Eddy in the Boston magazine Human Life which, In 1908, became the basis her book The Life of Mary Baker Eddy. The book became the first church-authorized biography to be sold in Christian Science Reading Rooms.Gabriel, Ralph H. (1933). Reviewed Work: Mary Baker Eddy, the Truth and the Tradition by Ernest Sutherland Bates, John V. Dittemore. The New England Quarterly 6 (1): 200–202. It was reprinted numerous times.

Although Wilbur was not a member of the church, she was friendly towards Eddy, and her articles and book were motivated in part to defend Eddy from a similar series of articles published around the same time by McClure's Magazine, which attacked Eddy and the church. Eddy later thanked Wilbur and the Concord Publishing Society for publishing the book.Kalijarvi, T. (1931). Reviewed Work: The Life of Mary Baker Eddy by Sibyl Wilbur. Social Science 6 (3): 321–322.

The book includes content based on interviews of many people who knew Eddy before she was famous. There have been notable critics of the book over the years however, such as Christian Science critic John V. Dittemore, and Gaius Glenn Atkins, a critic of new religious movements in general, who attacked the book saying that it "touches lightly or omits altogether those passages in Mrs. Eddy's life which do not fit in with the picture which Mrs. Eddy herself and the church desire to be perpetuated." The Mary Baker Eddy Library also notes criticism of the book for being "excessively laudatory" of Eddy, but says that "it was also based on factual reporting and helped counter basic misinformation about Eddy and Christian Science that was rampant at the time."

After writing her biography of Eddy, Wilbur continued to become even more involved with the women's suffrage movement, especially in San Diego, California where she moved in 1918.

Publications
The Life of Mary Baker Eddy (New York: Concord Publishing Co., 1908)

References

Further reading
Winfield Scott Downs. (1936). Stone, Sibyl Wilbur. In Encyclopedia of American Biography''. New York: The American Historical Society.

External links

1871 births
1946 deaths
American biographers
American women journalists
Christian Science writers
Hamline University alumni
Writers from Elmira, New York
Historians from New York (state)
American women biographers
American suffragists